R v Governor of Brockhill Prison, ex parte Evans (No 2) is an English case decided by the House of Lords on appeal from the Court of Appeal. It has been called "important".

It involved the unlawful detention of a prisoner. The governor had sentenced the prisoner on the basis of an interpretation of a statute which had originally been supported by the courts, but which had subsequently been held to be wrong. It was clear that the governor was blameless, but the sentence raised questions as to whether the new interpretation of the statute should apply prospectively only. The majority of the Law Lords held that, on the facts of this case, it was not appropriate for the interpretation to apply prospectively only, but all of them also accepted that the development of a rule might, in appropriate circumstances, apply prospectively. Lord Slynn of Hadley reasoned that "there may be decisions in which it would be desirable, and in no way unjust, that the effect of judicial rulings should be prospective or limited to certain claimants."

Court of Appeal

This was a decision of the Civil Division of the Court of Appeal, on appeal from the Queen's Bench Division of the High Court.

References 
R v Governor of Brockhill Prison, ex parte Evans (No 2) [2001] 2 AC 19 HL
R v Governor of Brockhill Prison, ex parte Evans (No 2) [1999] QB 1043 CA
R v Governor of Brockhill Prison, ex parte Evans [1997] QB 443
Andrew Grubb (series ed). The Law of Tort. Butterworths Common Law Series. Butterworths. 2002. Paragraph 9.35 at page 368.
Christian Witting. Street on Torts. Fourteenth Edition. Oxford University Press. 2015. Pages 265 and 270.
Jenny Steele. Tort Law: Text, Cases, and Materials. Fourth Edition. Oxford University Press. 2017. Pages 62 and 64.
Vera Bermingham and Carol Brennan. Tort Law Directions. Third Edition. Oxford University Press. 2012. Page 29.
Rachael Mulheron. Principles of Tort Law. Second Edition. Cambridge University Press. 2020. Pages 705 and 730.
Mary Arden. Tort Liability of Public Authorities in Comparative Perspective. British Institute of International and Comparative Law. 2002. Pages 19 and 29 to 31.
Carol Harlow, "A Punitive Role for Tort Law?". Pearson, Taggart and Harlow (eds). Administrative Law in a Changing State. Bloomsbury Academic. 2008. Page 257.
Michael Fordham. Judicial Review Handbook. Fifth Edition. Hart Publishing. 2008. Paragraphs 3.3.1,  11.1.7, 13.7.6, 24.4.9, 31.6.1 and 33.1.5.  
Hugh Southey and Adrian Fulford. Judicial Review: A Practical Guide. Jordans. 2004. Paragraphs 5.11, 7.2 and 7.2.6 at pages 156, 181 and 186.
Aidan O'Neill. Judicial Review in Scotland. Butterworths. 1999. Paragraph 14.50 at page 388.
Richard Gordon. EC Law in Judicial Review. Oxford University Press. 2007. Paragraph 9.99.
"Liability for false imprisonment". The Digest. Volume 37(4). Title "Prisons". Case 7268.
Stephen Livingstone, Tim Owen and Alison Macdonald. Prison Law. Fourth Edition. Oxford University Press. 2008. Paragraphs 13.47 and 14.62 at page 523 and 601.
Julian B Knowles. Blackstone's Guide to the Extradition Act 2003. Oxford University Press. 2004. Pages 66, 69 and 97.
Nicholls, Montgomery, and Knowles on the Law of Extradition and Mutual Assistance. Third Edition. Oxford University Press. 2013. Paragraphs 5.121, 7.43 and 7.61 at pages 95, 133 and 137.
Enid Campbell, "The Retrospectivity of Judicial Decisions and the Legality of Governmental Acts" (2003) 29 Monash University Law Review 49 at 60 to 62, 64, 67, 68, 75, 80, 82 and 83
Saimo Chahal, "False imprisonment in mental health cases" (1999) 149 New Law Journal 686 at 687 (7 May 1999)

2001 in England
2001 in case law
2001 in British law
House of Lords cases